Look at Them Beans is the 52nd album by country singer Johnny Cash, released in 1975 on Columbia Records. Following an unsuccessful attempt with the previous album, John R. Cash to update Cash's sound with a new set of session musicians (including members of Elvis Presley's stage band), Look at Them Beans reinstated The Tennessee Three as Cash's core session group.

The cover depicts him with his son, John Carter Cash, while the back cover features a dedication to Johnny Cash by his wife, June Carter Cash.

The album reached #38 on the Country Album Chart, while the title track, as the only released single, peaked at #17.

Track listing

Personnel
Johnny Cash - vocals, guitar
Bob Wootton, Jerry Hensley, Pete Wade, James Colvard, Dave Kirby, Kelso Herston, Glenn Keener - guitar
 Marshall Grant, Henry Strzelecki, Joe Allen - bass
 WS Holland, Kenny Malone, Jerry Carrigan, Willie Ackerman - drums
 Bobby Thompson - guitar, banjo
 Curly Chalker - steel guitar
 Johnny Gimble, Buddy Spicher, Marcy Gates, Marjorie Gates, Tommy Jackson - fiddle
 David Briggs, Earl Poole Ball - piano
 Shane Keister - keyboards
 George Tidwell, George Cunningham - trumpet
 The Nashville Edition - vocals

Additional personnel
Produced by Don Davis
"Texas, 1947" and "I Hardly Ever Sing Beer Drinking Songs" produced by Charlie Bragg
Engineered by Charlie Bragg, Roger Tucker, David Malloy and Freeman Ramsey at the House of Cash Studio, Hendersonville, Tennessee
Design by Bill Barnes
Photography by Marion Ward and Bill Barnes
Liner notes by June Carter Cash

Charts
Album – Billboard (United States)

Singles – Billboard (United States)

External links
Luma Electronic entry on Look at Them Beans

1975 albums
Johnny Cash albums
Albums produced by Don Davis (record producer)
Columbia Records albums